The Toronto Cup Stakes is a Canadian Thoroughbred horse race run annually on turf at Woodbine Racetrack in Toronto. Run in early July, the race is open to three-year-olds and is run over a distance of  miles (9 furlongs) on turf.

Inaugurated in 1890 as the Toronto Cup Handicap at the Old Woodbine Racetrack, it was raced on dirt and open to older horses until 1935. From inception through 1898 it was raced  at  miles, then from 1899 to 1934 at  miles. There was no race in 1918 and 1919 and was suspended in 1935 then revived in 1953 restricted to three-year-olds and competed at a distance of  miles on dirt. Since 1958 the race has been run on the turf with the exception of 1968 when it had to be switched to the main dirt track. In 1987 the turf race was modified to its present  miles except for 1994 when it was held at the Fort Erie Racetrack and run at its old -mile distance.

The race was run in two divisions in 1983, 1986, and 1999.

Records
Speed  record: 
 1:47.00 – Skybound (1997) (at current distance of  miles on turf)

Most wins by an owner:
 11 – Sam-Son Farm (1985, 1986, 1987, 1991, 1997, 2000, 2001, 2002, 2004, 2006, 2007)

Most wins by a jockey:
 7 – Todd Kabel (2000, 2001, 2003, 2004, 2005, 2006, 2007)

Most wins by a trainer:
 7 – Mark Frostad (1997, 2000, 2001, 2002, 2004, 2006, 2007)

Winners

* In 1964 there was a dead heat for first.

Ungraded stakes races in Canada
Turf races in Canada
Flat horse races for three-year-olds
Woodbine Racetrack
Recurring events established in 1890